The Beat Goes On: The Best of Sonny & Cher is the sixth compilation album by American pop rock duo Sonny & Cher, released in 1991 by Atco/Atlantic Records.

Album information 
It was released in 1991 and did not enter the album charts. 

The Beat Goes On: The Best of Sonny & Cher is a collection of Sonny and Cher's classic Atco era; the compilation covers a lot of ground for a single-disc anthology. 

Besides the duo's hits, it includes some Bono solo singles, most notably the 45 edit of "My Best Friend's Girl is Out of Sight," from his 1967 solo album Inner Views. None of Cher's solo material is here, which lends a slightly lopsided view of the duo's history.

A handful of their songs, such as "Baby Don't Go" and their breakout "I Got You Babe", represent the peak of a certain style of commercial folk-pop that was one of the defining sounds of the 1960s. It also includes lesser-known tracks, like the full-on Phil Spector tribute "It's the Little Things," the waltz-time "A Beautiful Story," and a spoken-word b-side called "Hello,".

Track listing 
All tracks composed by Sonny Bono; except where noted.
 "Baby Don't Go" – 3:09
 "Just You" – 3:36
 "Sing C'est La Vie" (Sonny Bono, Green, Stone) – 3:39
 "I Got You Babe" – 3:11
 "Why Don't They Let Us Fall in Love" (Phil Spector, E. Greenwich, J. Barry) – 2:29
 "Laugh At Me" - 2:50 
 "But You're Mine" - 3:02
 "The Revolution Kind" - 3:25
 "What Now My Love" (Carl Sigman, Gilbert Bécaud, Pierre Delanoë) - 3:28
 "Have I Stayed Too Long" - 3:42
 "Leave Me Be" (Chris White) - 2:03
 "Little Man" - 3:20
 "Living For You" - 3:30 
 "Love Don't Come" - 3:05
 "The Beat Goes On" - 3:27
 "A Beautiful Story" - 2:52
 "It's the Little Things" - 3:05
 "My Best Friend's Girl Is Out of Sight" - 4:13
 "Good Combination" (Barkan) 2:57
 "I Got You Babe (Good Times Soundtrack Version)" - 2:17
 "Hello" (Sonny Bono, Green, Stone) – 3:12

Credits

Personnel 
 Main Vocals: Cher
 Main Vocals: Sonny Bono

Production 
 Liner notes: Ken Barnes
 Remastering Series Director: Yves Beauvais
 Art direction: Carol Bobolts
 Art direction: Bob Defrin
 Mastering: Dan Hersch
 Mastering, compilation producer: Bill Inglot

References 

1991 greatest hits albums
Sonny & Cher albums
Atco Records compilation albums
Atlantic Records compilation albums